Liolaemus poecilochromus is a species of lizard in the family Iguanidae.  It is from Argentina.

References

pleopholis
Lizards of South America
Reptiles of Argentina
Endemic fauna of Argentina
Reptiles described in 1986
Taxa named by Raymond Laurent